Fabijan Krslovic (born 23 June 1995) is an Australian professional basketball player for the Tasmania JackJumpers of the National Basketball League (NBL). He played college basketball for University of Montana.

High school and college career
Whilst at high school, Krslovic was part of the St Aloysius' College and was named the team MVP both as a junior and as a senior.

Krslovic joined the Montana Grizzlies basketball team whilst studying at the University of Montana in 2014, and as a freshman he made an immediate impact. In his first season, he was the team's second-leading rebounder and the 19th in the Big Sky Conference for rebounding average, and shot a 52%. He also played in all 33 games the team played, and started in 26 of them.

Across the remainder of his college career, Krslovic regularly was found higher up on the stats leaderboard, particularly for rebounds, shooting percentage, steals and blocks. He also played in all 132 games that the team played in during his time at college, and earned a total of 116 starts. He was also named on the Big Sky Academic All-Conference team for three consecutive years across his final years at college.

Professional career

Cairns Taipans (2018–2021)
Following his college career, Krslovic returned to Australia and joined the Cairns basketball program. He first joined the Cairns Marlins of the Queensland Basketball League (QBL). Following a season with the squad, Krslovic joined the Marlins' affiliated club the Cairns Taipans of the National Basketball League (NBL) as a development player for the 2018–19 NBL season.

After making five appearances that NBL season and spending another season with the Marlins, on 13 June 2019, Krslovic was elevated to the roster of the Cairns Taipans for the 2019–20 NBL season and signed a one-year deal with a club option. Across the Taipans 28 regular season and three finals series games he made 27 appearances, where he averaged 11.38 minutes and scored a total of 83 points, with 72 rebounds, 11 assists, 16 steals and 9 blocks.

On 7 July 2020, the Taipans took up the club option on Krslovic's contract and kept him at the club for the 2020–21 NBL season.

Tasmania JackJumpers (2021–present)
On 14 July 2021, Krslovic signed with the Tasmania JackJumpers on a two-year deal.

On 14 March 2023, Krslovic re-signed with the JackJumpers on a two-year deal.

National team career
In 2012, Krslovic won a silver medal at the FIBA U17 World Cup whilst playing for the Australia men's national under-17 basketball team. The following year he also represented Australia in the under-19 team, however, he was unable to play at the World Championships in Prague.

References

External links

Cairns Taipans profile
FIBA.com profile
Montana Grizzlies bio

1995 births
Living people
Australian people of Croatian descent
Australian expatriate basketball people in the United States
Australian men's basketball players
Basketball players from Sydney
Cairns Taipans players
Montana Grizzlies basketball players
Power forwards (basketball)
Tasmania JackJumpers players